The Knight-Bagehot Fellowship Program in Economics and Business Journalism was created at Columbia University in the City of New York in response to the growing public interest in financial news and the increasing demand for trained editors and reporters to cover the field of business and economics.  The Fellowship offers free tuition plus a $60,000 stipend.

History

In 1975, under the leadership of Dean Elie Abel, the Columbia Graduate School of Journalism sought to address the problem of deficiencies in business news coverage by establishing the Walter Bagehot (pronounced badge-it) Fellowship, an intensive year-long program of instruction in economics and business for working journalists. The co-founding directors were Stephen B. Shepard and Soma Golden Behr. Also serving as directors were Christopher J. Welles (1977-1985); Mary Bralove (1985-1987); Pamela Hollie Kluge (1987-1990) and Pauline Tai (1990-1993). Terri Thompson served from 1993-2018, when she retired. Raju Narisetti was director from 2018-2019. Ann Grimes, the current director of the program, joined as Director in early 2020.

Originally named in honor of the 19th-century economist and editor of The Economist, it was renamed the Knight-Bagehot Fellowship in 1987 in recognition of the John S. and James L. Knight-Foundation's $3 million gift as an endowment for the program.

Today, the Knight-Bagehot Fellowship is the only academic full-time degree-granting mid-career program for journalists devoted to the study of business and economics. Fellows receive full tuition and a living stipend to attend Columbia for one academic year. The chief criterion for selection is demonstrated journalistic excellence. Between 1975 and 2020, nearly 400 accomplished journalists completed this rigorous program; many now hold positions in newsrooms around the world.

Directors (past and present)
 Stephen Shepard (1975–1976)
 Soma Golden Behr (1976–1977)
 Chris Welles (1977–1985)
 Mary Bralove (1985–1987)
 Pamela Hollie Kluge (1987–1990)
 Pauline Tai (1990–1993)
 Terri Thompson (1993–2018)
 Raju Narisetti (2018–2019)
 Ann Grimes (2020–present)

Notable alumni

 Julia Angwin
 John Authers
 Janet Bodnar
 Neill Borowski
 David Cho
 Gail Collins
 Kate Davidson
 Barbara Demick
 Liza Featherstone
 Karl Taro Greenfeld
 Gail Gregg
 Jan Hopkins
 Mara Liasson
Dave Lindorff
 Phillip Longman
 Amanda Macias
 Larry Madowo
 Floyd Norris
 Donna Rosato
 John Saunders
 Anya Schiffrin
 Donna Shaw-Bielski
 Seth Stevenson
 Craig Torres
 Ann Scott Tyson
 Mary Williams Walsh
 David Wessel
 Gerri Willis
 Christine Young-Pertel

References

External links 
Official Site

Columbia University Graduate School of Journalism
Journalism fellowships